"You Can't Hurry Love" is a 1966 song by The Supremes, notably covered by Phil Collins.

You Can't Hurry Love may also refer to:

 "You Can't Hurry Love" (Concretes song), 2004
 You Can't Hurry Love (film), a 1988 comedy film featuring Bridget Fonda